"More Love" is a song co-written and recorded by American country music singer Doug Stone.  It was released in June 1994 as the third and final single and title track from his album More Love.  It peaked at number 6 on the Billboard Hot Country Singles & Tracks chart and number 4 on The Canadian RPM Tracks chart.  The song was written by Stone and Gary Burr.

Content
After a relationship fails, the narrator tries to think of what he did wrong, then realizing he should have given her "More Love" and less material things.

Chart performance

Year-end charts

References

1994 singles
1993 songs
Doug Stone songs
Songs written by Gary Burr
Song recordings produced by James Stroud
Epic Records singles
Songs written by Doug Stone